The Oregon Rail Heritage Center (ORHC) is a railway museum in Portland, Oregon.  Along with other rolling stock, the museum houses three steam locomotives owned by the City of Portland: Southern Pacific 4449, Spokane, Portland & Seattle 700, and Oregon Railroad & Navigation Co. 197, the first two of which are restored and operable. The center opened to the public on September 22, 2012.  The project to establish the center was led by the Oregon Rail Heritage Foundation (ORHF), a non-profit organization established in 2002. The museum site is in Southeast Portland.

Background

ORHF was tasked with finding a new home for the three city-owned locomotives, after planned changes by Union Pacific Railroad (UP) made it apparent that the locomotives would need to be moved out of their longtime home in the UP's (formerly Southern Pacific's) Brooklyn Roundhouse, a 1941-built  roundhouse from Brooklyn Rail Yard in Southeast Portland's Brooklyn neighborhood.  ORHF comprises several entities, including railway preservation and railfan groups as well as the city's Bureau of Parks & Recreation.

Proposals to construct a new enginehouse to house the historic locomotives were expanded to encompass a visitor center and eventually an interpretive center.

Construction

Ground-breaking for the  enginehouse took place in October 2011.  The three steam locomotives were moved to the site from the Brooklyn Roundhouse on June 26, 2012, and were temporarily placed outdoors, awaiting completion of the enginehouse. With the house fully enclosed (though not completed), the locomotives were moved inside on July 28.  Several vintage rail passenger coaches have also been moved to the site from the Brooklyn Yard (surrounding the roundhouse), where they had been outdoors, and they will continue to be kept outdoors at the new center.  The budget for the initial phase of construction is $5.9 million, and funding has come mainly from donations, but with the City of Portland loaning $1 million.  The Brooklyn Roundhouse was demolished in early September 2012, but its turntable was removed and placed in storage. A major fund raising effort has since resulted in the turntable components being updated and prepared for service, and a new pit excavated. As of February 2023, installation of the turntable is nearly complete.

The Oregon Rail Heritage Center opened to the public on September 22, 2012.  As of early 2023, it is open for visitors Thursday through Sunday, from 1 p.m. to 5 p.m., with no admission charge. Donations are welcomed.

Collection

The centerpieces of ORHC's collection are the three steam locomotives: Southern Pacific 4449, Spokane, Portland & Seattle 700, and Oregon Railroad & Navigation Co. 197. All were donated to the City of Portland in 1958 and were on static display at Oaks Amusement Park until the mid-1970s or later.  No. 4449 was moved to the Burlington Northern Hoyt Street Roundhouse in 1974 for restoration and proceeded to become famous nationwide, when it hauled the American Freedom Train throughout the country during the United States Bicentennial celebrations of 1975–76. It was thereafter stored and maintained at the Brooklyn Roundhouse between excursions. SP&S 700 moved to the roundhouse from Oaks Park in 1986, and OR&N 197 followed in 1996. SP&S 700 is listed on the National Register of Historic Places.

Union Pacific diesel switcher locomotive No. 96 was added to the collection in 2016, donated to ORHF by UP.  It is an SW10-class locomotive, built originally as an SW7 in 1950 by Electro-Motive Diesel (and originally numbered 1821) and rebuilt as an SW10 by UP in 1982. It arrived at the ORHC in 2017.

Several pieces of privately owned rolling stock also reside at the new center, including another diesel switcher, other locomotives and several vintage passenger and freight cars.  One of the locomotives is Nickel Plate Road 190, one of two surviving ALCO PA locomotives left in the United States. Mount Emily Lumber Company Shay 1 is due to be moved to the ORHC in 2023.

Public facilities at the new enginehouse are expected to be minimal initially, consisting of a few exhibits and an area where restoration work on the locomotives and other equipment can be observed, but ORHF plans to install a full interpretive center later, on the building's second floor.

The operational steam locomotives are occasionally used on excursion trips, including an annual Holiday Express, and the new enginehouse was sited and designed in such a way as to enable these trips to continue. However, beginning in Fall 2022, the Holiday Express trips will be handled by smaller logging-oriented steam locomotives, as the SP 4449 and SP&S 700 locos are too heavy and long for current track conditions.  Union Pacific Railroad's north–south main line runs past the building, and is connected to the Heritage Center's tracks, allowing the locomotives and other rail cars to be moved onto or off of the mainline tracks. The rail cars also have access to Oregon Pacific Railroad (OPR) tracks at the new location.

See also
 List of museums in Oregon

References

External links

 Oregon Rail Heritage Center page at ORHF website

2012 establishments in Oregon
Museums established in 2012
Museums in Portland, Oregon
Railroad museums in Oregon
Southeast Portland, Oregon
Transportation buildings and structures in Portland, Oregon
Historical society museums in Oregon